Ideal is a city in Macon County, Georgia, United States. The population was 407 at the 2020 census, down from 499 in 2010.

History
The town was originally named "Joetown", but when two railroad executives stopped in the town, one proclaimed it an "ideal" place for a railroad station, and the other declared he'd just named it.

The Georgia General Assembly incorporated Ideal as a town in 1906.

Geography
Ideal is located in western Macon County at  (32.372918, -84.188822). Georgia State Route 90 passes through the center of town, leading southeast  to Oglethorpe, the county seat, and northwest  to Rupert.

It resides at the confluence of Whitewater and Cedar creeks, two spring-fed tributaries of the Flint River.

Demographics

2020 census

As of the 2020 United States census, there were 407 people, 124 households, and 64 families residing in the city.

2000 census
As of the census of 2000, there were 518 people, 174 households, and 123 families residing in the city. The racial makeup of the city was 32.43% White, 66.22% African American, 0.19% Native American, and 1.16% from two or more races. Hispanic or Latino of any race were 0.39% of the population.

There were 174 households, out of which 36.8% had children under the age of 18 living with them, 36.2% were married couples living together, 28.7% had a female householder with no husband present, and 29.3% were non-families. 29.3% of all households were made up of individuals, and 16.1% had someone living alone who was 65 years of age or older.  The average household size was 2.44 and the average family size was 2.95.

In the city, the population was spread out, with 25.1% under the age of 18, 6.6% from 18 to 24, 20.8% from 25 to 44, 22.6% from 45 to 64, and 24.9% who were 65 years of age or older.  The median age was 43 years. For every 100 females, there were 63.9 males.  For every 100 females age 18 and over, there were 61.0 males.

The median income for a household in the city was $16,538, and the median income for a family was $21,250. Males had a median income of $28,125 versus $15,714 for females. The per capita income for the city was $9,712.  About 31.3% of families and 31.1% of the population were below the poverty line, including 37.5% of those under age 18 and 43.0% of those age 65 or over.

References

Cities in Georgia (U.S. state)
Cities in Macon County, Georgia